Stanton Mountain is a  mountain summit located in the Livingston Range, of Glacier National Park in the U.S. state of Montana. The mountain's name refers to Mrs. Lottie Stanton who lived near the west side of the park in the late 1800s, and with her husband operated a livery stable in  historic Demersville. She was a pioneering woman who followed the construction camps during the railroad building days. The mountain's name was officially adopted in 1929. In the late 1800s it was known as Mt. Lottie Stanton. The nearest higher peak is Mount Vaught,  to the northeast. Precipitation runoff from the mountain drains into tributaries of the Flathead River.

Climate

Based on the Köppen climate classification, Stanton Mountain is located in a subarctic climate zone characterized by long, usually very cold winters, and short, cool to mild summers. Temperatures can drop below −10 °F with wind chill factors below −30 °F.

Geology

Like other mountains in Glacier National Park, Stanton Mountain is composed of sedimentary rock laid down during the Precambrian to Jurassic periods.

See also
 List of mountains and mountain ranges of Glacier National Park (U.S.)
 Geology of the Rocky Mountains

Gallery

References

External links
 National Park Service web site: Glacier National Park
 Lake McDonald web cam with Stanton on the left: National Park Service
 Stanton Mountain weather: Mountain Forecast

Stanton Mountain
Mountains of Flathead County, Montana
Stanton Mountain
Stanton Mountain
North American 2000 m summits